Vice Admiral Rama Kant Pattanaik, PVSM, AVSM, YSM is the former Deputy Chief of the Naval Staff (DCNS) of Indian Navy and former Deputy Chief of Integrated Defence Staff(DCIDS).

Education
Pattanaik attended the National Defence Academy, as well as the Defence Services Staff College, Wellington, Army War College, Mhow and National Defence College, New Delhi.

Career
He was commissioned into the Indian Navy on 1 January 1978. He retired as DCNS of the Indian Navy on 31 October 2015, and Vice Admiral Karambir Singh, AVSM succeeded him.

Awards

References

Living people
Indian Navy admirals
Deputy Chiefs of Naval Staff (India)
Flag Officers Commanding Western Fleet
Flag Officers Sea Training
Recipients of the Param Vishisht Seva Medal
Recipients of the Ati Vishisht Seva Medal
Year of birth missing (living people)
National Defence College, India alumni
Recipients of the Yudh Seva Medal
Army War College, Mhow alumni
Defence Services Staff College alumni